Jia Nailiang (born 12 April 1984) is a Chinese actor. Jia graduated from Beijing Film Academy. Jia ranked 50th on Forbes China Celebrity 100 list 2015, 33rd in 2017, and 96th in 2019.

Personal life
Jia married actress Li Xiaolu in 2012. The same year, Li gave birth to their daughter, Jelena. In October 2019, Li was revealed to have shot three intimate videos with rapper , who was revealed to have been her lover in 2017. Jia and Li divorced on November 14, 2019.

Filmography

Film

Television series

Variety show

Awards and nominations

References

External links 
 

1984 births
Living people
Male actors from Harbin
Chinese television producers
Chinese male film actors
Chinese male television actors
21st-century Chinese male actors
Beijing Film Academy alumni